The Thompson Street School is a historic school building at 58 Crapo Street in New Bedford, Massachusetts.  The -story school was built in 1884 to a design by Brownell & Murkland, and features a distinctive blend of Queen Anne, Stick, and Romanesque styling.  It was built during a period of rapid growth in the area, and was named for James D. Thompson, a prominent locally-born military leader and politician. It was converted for use as a community center in 1976.

The building was listed on the National Register of Historic Places in 1990.

See also
National Register of Historic Places listings in New Bedford, Massachusetts

References

School buildings on the National Register of Historic Places in Massachusetts
Buildings and structures in New Bedford, Massachusetts
National Register of Historic Places in New Bedford, Massachusetts